OMAC can refer to:
OMAC (Buddy Blank), a DC Comics superhero
OMAC (comics):  a fictional organization of powerful cyborgs in comic books published by DC Comics
The OMAC Project, a comics miniseries featuring with the OMACs
Michael Costner, the last remaining OMAC cyborg, chronicled in the 2006 OMAC miniseries
Old Man's Aircraft Company, a business aircraft company which made several prototypes of the Laser 300 plane in the late 1980s and early 1990s
One-key MAC, a construction in cryptography
Order of Malta Ambulance Corps, an Irish first-aid organisation linked to the Sovereign Military Order of Malta
OMAC (Industry Organization): Organization for Machine Automation and Control
Otherways, Otherways Management Association Club (OMAC), a vanity award organisation